Charles Austin Weaver (November 1, 1905 – September 11, 1967) was an American football player. He played college football for the University of Chicago and in the National Football League (NFL) as a guard for the Chicago Cardinals and Portsmouth Spartans, both during the 1930 season. He appeared in ten NFL games, four as a starter.

References

1905 births
1967 deaths
Chicago Maroons football players
Chicago Cardinals players
Portsmouth Spartans players
Players of American football from Arkansas
People from Independence County, Arkansas